The Anthracite Open was a golf tournament played at Scranton Country Club, Scranton, Pennsylvania. It was played in 1939 and 1940. An event was planned for 1941 but was canceled.

The 1939 event was played from June 23 to 25 and was won by Henry Picard with a score of 273, six ahead of Sam Snead. The 1940 event was played from September 6 to 8. The tournament was won by Sam Snead who finished two ahead of Byron Nelson.

Winners

References

Former PGA Tour events
Golf in Pennsylvania